The 2011 Rallye Sanremo (53º Rallye Sanremo), was the 9th round of the 2011 Intercontinental Rally Challenge (IRC) season. The thirteen stage asphalt rally took place over 22 – 24 September 2011. The longest stage of the rally, Ronde, was run in darkness. All other stages were run in daylight.

Introduction
The rally base was located along the sea front and the old railway station in the heart of the town of Sanremo. Fifteen S2000 cars started the event with the main front runners in the championship, excluding Juho Hänninen, taking part.

Results

Overall

Special stages

References

External links 
 The official website for the rally
 The official website of the Intercontinental Rally Challenge

Sanremo Rally
Sanremo
2011